Mohammad Nafees Iqbal Khan (born 31 January 1985), better known as Nafees Iqbal, is a former Bangladeshi international cricketer. He played as a right-handed opening batsman, and was a part-time right-arm medium pace bowler.

Biography 
Nafees Iqbal Khan was born to footballer Iqbal Khan and mother Nusrat Iqbal Khan, in the port city of Chittagong. His paternal Khan family is a prestigious family in the city, migrated from Bihar. Nafees Iqbal is the elder brother of Tamim Iqbal and the nephew of former Bangladesh captain Akram Khan, who both played Test cricket for Bangladesh.

Career 

He represented Bangladesh U19 team in youth level and captained the national side at the 2002 Under-19 Cricket World Cup.

He rose to limelight and prominence after scoring a hundred (118 off 168 balls) for Bangladesh A against the touring England team in 2003–04 and he was disparaging towards the England spinners which he faced, commenting their spinners as "ordinary". His comments drew more press attention than his batting. He also played for Bangladesh during the 2004 ICC Champions Trophy.

His only Test century came in January 2005, one which aided Bangladesh towards their first-ever series victory, 1–0 against Zimbabwe. However he couldn't achieve better milestones like his brother Tamim Iqbal during his short playing career and was dropped from the national team in 2006 following a string of poor scores. His last international match came in April 2006 which was a test match against Australia. In 2020, one of the friends of Nafees Iqbal revealed that Tamim Iqbal's success was primarily due to the sacrifice of his older brother Nafees.

In 2016, he was appointed as team manager of Khulna Titans in the Bangladesh Premier League. Nafees was recruited in by the management team of the Mumbai Indians for the 2018 Indian Premier League season as a translator for his fellow Bangladeshi seamer Mustafizur Rahman. His role as a translator was also credited in the 2019 Netflix original webseries Cricket Fever: Mumbai Indians.

Personal life 
He is the elder brother of cricketer Tamim Iqbal and the nephew of former cricketer Akram Khan. On 20 June 2020, he was reportedly tested positive for COVID-19 and has been kept in self isolation at his residence in Chittagong.

References

External links
 

1985 births
Living people
Bangladeshi cricketers
21st-century Bangladeshi cricketers
Bangladesh One Day International cricketers
Bangladesh Test cricketers
Chittagong Division cricketers
Brothers Union cricketers
Bangladesh East Zone cricketers
Khelaghar Samaj Kallyan Samity cricketers
Khan cricketing family
Bangladeshi Sunni Muslims
Bangladeshi people of Bihari descent
21st-century Muslims
People from Chittagong